Silvestro Centofanti (1794–1880) was an Italian politician. He served in the Senate  of the Kingdom of Sardinia. He was a recipient of the Order of Saints Maurice and Lazarus.

Bibliography

External links
Ulteriori informazioni nella scheda sul database dell'Archivio Storico del Senato, I Senatori d'Italia

1794 births
1880 deaths
20th-century Italian politicians
Members of the Senate of the Kingdom of Sardinia
Recipients of the Order of Saints Maurice and Lazarus